Pomaderris ferruginea, commonly known as rusty pomaderris, is a species of flowering plant in the family Rhamnaceae and is endemic to south-eastern continental Australia. It is a shrub with rusty-hairy stems, egg-shaped leaves, and clusters of cream-coloured, whitish or yellow flowers.

Description
Flowering occurs from August to October.

Taxonomy
Pomaderris ferruginea was first formally described in 1837 by Eduard Fenzl in Enumeratio plantarum quas in Novae Hollandiae ora austro-occidentali ad fluvium Cygnorum et in sinu Regis Georgii collegit Carolus Liber Baro de Hügel from an unpublished description by Franz Sieber. The specific epithet (ferruginea) means "rust-coloured".

Distribution and habitat
Rusty pomaderris grows in open forest, often along streams from south-east Queensland, along the coast and tablelands of New South Wales and as far east as Bairnsdale in Victoria.

References

Flora of New South Wales
ferruginea
Flora of Victoria (Australia)
Flora of Queensland
Taxa named by Eduard Fenzl